Yanwang or Yan Wang may refer to:
 The kings of Yan (state) (燕王; Yānwáng)
The kings of Former Yan (前燕王; Qiányànwáng)
The kings of Later Yan (后燕王; Hòuyànwáng)
The kings of Northern Yan (北燕王; Bĕiyànwáng)
The kings of Southern Yan (南燕王; Nányànwáng)
The kings of Western Yan (西燕王; Xīyànwáng)
 King Yan, Chinese deity of the dead. Often conflated with Yama (Buddhist).
 The Yongle Emperor of the Ming dynasty, who was previously known as the Prince of Yan (燕王; Yānwáng) before his enthronement

See also
 Wang Yan (disambiguation)